"Miami 2 Ibiza" is a song by Swedish house music group Swedish House Mafia and English rapper Tinie Tempah. It was released as the second and final single from the group's debut studio album and compilation, Until One (2010) by Virgin Records on 4 October 2010. The song is also included on Tempah's debut album Disc-Overy (2010) and later on the group's second studio/compilation album, Until Now (2012). In January 2011, the single was certified Gold in Australia.

Critical reception
Nick Levine of Digital Spy gave the song a somewhat positive review stating:  "Urban British pop and commercial European dance are now such comfortable bedfellows that this collaboration between a trio of Scando knob-twiddling types and the best thing to come out of Plumstead since Shampoo barely raises a brow. Up next: Basshunter ft. Ms Dynamite? However, just because the two genres are comfortable bedfellows doesn't mean the earth moves every time they do the dirty. Tinie Tempah steers 'Miami 2 Ibiza' towards its big whooshy bridge and trancey arms-in-the-air chorus with his customary lyrical flair, but the result still feels like the musical equivalent of the Cam 'n' Cleggy coalition. You couldn't accuse it of being ineffective, but you wouldn't say it works entirely seamlessly either.

Music video
The music video was directed by Christian Larson and was uploaded to YouTube on 1 October 2010. The video shows a videotape being made of a couple's vacation, with some shots of Tinie Tempah and the Swedish House Mafia performing. The video was shot chronologically and the shoot started in Miami. Larson said: "The video is also meant to depict a kind of powerful independent woman, someone who takes from life what they want and does what they want." It has received over 88 million hits on YouTube. Most of the video is set on one woman and follows her around with a video camera on a journey from Miami in Florida to Ibiza in Spain.

Track listing

 Digital download
 "Miami 2 Ibiza" - 3:24

 Digital download - Instrumental
 "Miami 2 Ibiza" (Instrumental) - 6:15

 Digital EP
 "Miami 2 Ibiza" (Clean Radio Edit) - 2:57
 "Miami 2 Ibiza" (Explicit Radio Edit) - 2:57
 "Miami 2 Ibiza" (Extended Vocal Mix) - 5:05
 "Miami 2 Ibiza" (Instrumental) - 6:15
 "Miami 2 Ibiza" (Sander Van Doorn Remix) - 5:57
 "Miami 2 Ibiza" (Danny Byrd Remix) - 5:14

 12" vinyl #1
 "Miami 2 Ibiza" (Danny Byrd Instrumental) - 5:14
 "Miami 2 Ibiza" (Danny Byrd Remix) - 5:14
 "Miami 2 Ibiza" (Danny Byrd Dub) - 5:20

 12" vinyl #2
 "Miami 2 Ibiza" (Instrumental) - 6:15
 "Miami 2 Ibiza" (Extended Vocal Mix) - 5:05
 "Miami 2 Ibiza" (Sander Van Doorn Remix) - 5:57

 2011 BRIT Awards Performance
 "Written in the Stars" (featuring Eric Turner) / "Miami 2 Ibiza" / "Pass Out" (featuring Labrinth) (Live from the BRITs) - 4:43

Charts and certifications

Weekly charts

Year-end charts

Certifications

Release history

See also
List of number-one dance hits of 2010 (UK)
List of number-one dance singles of 2011 (U.S.)

References

2010 singles
Tinie Tempah songs
Swedish House Mafia songs
Songs written by Sebastian Ingrosso
Songs written by Axwell
Songs written by Steve Angello
Music videos shot in Ibiza
Songs written by Tinie Tempah
2010 songs